The 56th Punjabi Rifles (Frontier Force) was an infantry regiment of the British Indian Army. It was raised in 1849 as the 2nd Regiment of Punjab Infantry. It was designated as the 56th Punjabi Rifles (Frontier Force) in 1906 and became 2nd Battalion 13th Frontier Force Rifles in 1922. In 1947, it was allocated to the Pakistan Army, where it continues to exist as 8th Battalion The Frontier Force Regiment.

Early history
The regiment was raised on 18 May 1849 by Lieutenant JC Johnston at Mianwali as part of the Transfrontier Brigade. In 1851, the brigade was expanded and redesignated as the Punjab Irregular Force, which later became famous as the Punjab Frontier Force or The Piffers. The Piffers consisted of five regiments of cavalry, eleven regiments of infantry and five batteries of artillery besides the Corps of Guides. Their mission was to maintain order on the Punjab Frontier; a task they performed with great aplomb. The 2nd Punjab Infantry took part in numerous frontier operations besides the Great Indian Mutiny of 1857-58, when took part in Siege of Delhi, the Siege and Capture of Lucknow, the Battle of Cawnpore, the Rohilkhand Campaign and the capture of Bareilly. During the Second Afghan War of 1878-80, the regiment fought in the Battle of Peiwar Kotal. In 1897, it took part in the Tirah Campaign.

56th Punjabi Rifles (Frontier Force)

Subsequent to the reforms brought about in the Indian Army by Lord Kitchener in 1903, the regiment's designation was first changed to 56th Infantry (Frontier Force) and then in 1906, to 56th Punjabi Rifles (Frontier Force). In 1914, the regiment's class composition was two companies each of Dogras, Pathans, Sikhs, and Punjabi Muslims. During the First World War, the regiment served throughout with the 28th Indian Brigade. In 1915, it served in Egypt and Aden (Yemen), moving to Mesopotamia in December. Here, it fought with great gallantry in the bloody battles for the Relief of Kut al Amara on the Tigris Front in 1916-17, the capture of Baghdad and in operations north of Baghdad at Istabulat, Daur and Tikrit. In 1918, the regiment moved to Palestine and took part in the Battle of Megiddo, which led to the annihilation of the Turkish Army in Palestine. It returned to India in 1920. In 1917, the 56th Punjabi Rifles raised a second battalion, which served in the Third Afghan War of 1919. The regiment's total casualties during the war were 1679, including 389 killed or died of wounds.

Subsequent History
After the First World War, the two battalions of 56th Punjabi Rifles were grouped with the 55th, 57th, 58th and 59th Scinde Rifles (Frontier Force) to form the 13th Frontier Force Rifles in 1922. The 1st Battalion 56th Punjabi Rifles became the 2nd Battalion, while 2nd Battalion 56th Punjabi Rifles became the 10th (Training) Battalion of the new regiment. During the Second World War, the battalion served with distinction in the Burma Campaign. In 1947, the Frontier Force Rifles was allotted to Pakistan Army. In 1948, 2 FF Rifles fought in the Kashmir War against India. In 1956, the Frontier Force Rifles and the Pathan Regiment were merged with the Frontier Force Regiment, and 2 FF Rifles was redesignated as 8 FF. During the Indo-Pakistan War of 1965, the battalion served in the Rann of Kutch and Rajasthan Sector.

Genealogy
1849 2nd Regiment of Punjab Infantry
1851 2nd Regiment of Infantry, Punjab Irregular Force
1865 2nd Regiment of Infantry, Punjab Frontier Force
1901 2nd Punjab Infantry
1903 56th Infantry (Frontier Force)
1906 56th Punjabi Rifles (Frontier Force)
1917 1st Battalion 56th Punjabi Rifles (Frontier Force)
1922 2nd Battalion 13th Frontier Force Rifles
1945 2nd Battalion The Frontier Force Rifles
1956 8th Battalion The Frontier Force Regiment

References

Further reading
 History of the 2nd Battalion 13th Frontier Force Rifles 1849-1931. (1933). Bury St Edmund's: Groom and Son.
 Condon, Brig WEH. (1953). The Frontier Force Rifles. Aldershot: Gale & Polden.
 Young, Brig WHH. (1945). Regimental History of the 13th Frontier Force Rifles. Rawalpindi: The Frontier Exchange Press.
 North, REFG. (1934). The Punjab Frontier Force: A Brief Record of Their Services 1846-1924. DI Khan: Commercial Steam Press.
 Hayauddin, Maj Gen M. (1950). One Hundred Glorious Years: A History of the Punjab Frontier Force, 1849-1949. Lahore: Civil and Military Gazette Press.
 Dey, RSBN. (1905). A Brief Account of the Late Punjab Frontier Force, From its Organization in 1849 to its Re-distribution on 31st March 1903. Calcutta.
 Attiqur Rahman, Lt Gen M. (1980). The Wardens of the Marches – A History of the Piffers 1947-71. Lahore: Wajidalis.
 Khan, Maj Muhammad Nawaz. (1996). The Glorious Piffers 1843-1995. Abbottabad: The Frontier Force Regimental Centre.
 Gaylor, John. (1991). Sons of John Company: The Indian and Pakistan Armies 1903- 1991. Stroud: Spellmount. 
Barthorp, M, and Burn, J. (1979). Indian Infantry Regiments 1860-1914. London: Osprey. 
Sumner, Ian. (2001). The Indian Army 1914-1947. London: Osprey.

See also
The Frontier Force Regiment
13th Frontier Force Rifles
Punjab Irregular Force

British Indian Army infantry regiments
Frontier Force Regiment
Military units and formations established in 1849
1849 establishments in British India
R